Edward Cross (November 11, 1798 – April 6, 1887) was a Democratic member of the United States House of Representatives from the state of Arkansas.

Biography
Cross was born in Hawkins County, Tennessee, and he attended public schools during his youth.  He studied law and was admitted to the bar. He owned slaves.

Career
In 1826 Cross moved to Arkansas and was appointed as a federal judge for the Territory of Arkansas on May 26, 1830.  From April 30, 1836 to September 1, 1838 he served as United States surveyor general for Arkansas.

Cross was elected as a Democrat to the Twenty-sixth, Twenty-seventh, and Twenty-eighth United States Congresses between March 4, 1839 and March 3, 1845. During the Twenty-eighth Congress he served as chairman of the Committee on Private Land Claims.

Cross served as a justice of the Arkansas Supreme Court from July 1845 to 1855.  Cross served as president of the Cairo & Fulton Railway (later the St. Louis, Iron Mountain and Southern Railway from 1855 to 1862.  In 1874 he was appointed attorney general of Arkansas.

Death
Cross died at his residence, Marlbrook, near Washington, Hempstead County, Arkansas on 6 April 1887  (age 88 years, 146 days). He was interred at his residence,  then his remains were moved and interred at the Marlbrook Cemetery near modern-day Blevins Arkansas in the 20th century. Cross County, Arkansas is named for his son, David Cross.

References

External links

1798 births
1887 deaths
People from Hawkins County, Tennessee
Democratic Party members of the United States House of Representatives from Arkansas
Justices of the Arkansas Supreme Court
American slave owners
19th-century American politicians
19th-century American judges